Hennan may refer to:

Hennan (surname)

 Clarence William Hennan (1894-1956), an internationally recognized philatelist

Other

 Hennan, a village in Ljusdal Municipality, Hälsingland, Gävleborg County, Sweden.